The Vezzana (also Cima di Vezzana) is the highest peak in the Pala group, a mountain range of the Dolomites, northern Italy. It is located in the northern part of the Dolomites, between the Taibon Agordino and Primiero comunes of Belluno and Trentino. It has an altitude of 3,192 metres.

The peak is flanked by that of the Cimon della Pala. It was first ascended in 1872 by Douglas William Freshfield and Charles Comyns Tucker, who reached it from the Travignolo glacier and the Passo di Travignolo. Unusual for the time, they climbed the summit without local guides, as these had declined to go further at reaching the glacier

References

Mountains of Veneto
Mountains of Trentino
Mountains of the Alps
Dolomites
Alpine three-thousanders